SC Sand is a German sport club from Willstätt, Baden-Württemberg. The club was founded on 11 August 1946 and competes in football, aerobics, judo and qigong. The club is most known for its women's football section which plays in the Bundesliga.

Women's football
The women's section was founded in July 1980. Two years later one participated in league play. After two years one reached the Verbandsliga Südbaden, the then highest league. In 1992 the team won the Verbandsliga Championship and played a promotion playoff for the then active Bundesliga. The team lost however. In 1996 the team won the Verbandsliga again and won the promotion playoff. The team achieved a sixth-place finish in its southern Bundesliga division. As the Bundesliga merged both divisions the team had to play a qualification-round in which the team got second out of four, thus failing to qualify for the next Bundesliga season. 2004 the 2nd Bundesliga was founded and SC Sand has been playing there from the start achieving only midfield places.

Recent seasons

Current squad

Former players

References

External links

 
Women's football clubs in Germany
Football clubs in Baden-Württemberg
Association football clubs established in 1946
1946 establishments in Germany
Frauen-Bundesliga clubs